In molecular biology, olfactory marker protein is a protein involved in signal transduction.
It is a highly expressed, cytoplasmic protein found in mature olfactory sensory receptor neurons of all vertebrates. OMP is a modulator of the olfactory signal transduction cascade. The crystal structure of OMP reveals a beta sandwich consisting of eight strands in two sheets with a jelly-roll topology. Three highly conserved regions have been identified as possible protein–protein interaction sites in OMP, indicating a possible role for OMP in modulating such interactions, thereby acting as a molecular switch.

External links

References

Protein families